The 1964 La Flèche Wallonne was the 28th edition of La Flèche Wallonne cycle race and was held on 4 May 1964. The race started in Liège and finished in Charleroi. The race was won by Gilbert Desmet of the Wiel's team.

General classification

References

1964 in road cycling
1964
1964 in Belgian sport
1964 Super Prestige Pernod